The 1990 Oregon State Beavers football team represented Oregon State University in the 1990 NCAA Division I-A football season. The Beavers ended the season with one win and ten losses.  1990 was Oregon State's 20th consecutive losing season.  The Beavers scored 152 points and allowed 371 points. The team was led by head coach Dave Kragthorpe.  The season is most memorable for the 35–21 win over Arizona.  According to David Rothman, this was the greatest upset in all of college football between 1985 and 1998. The probability of Oregon State winning was 7.4%.

Schedule

References

Oregon State
Oregon State Beavers football seasons
Oregon State Beavers football